Keralapanineeyam (or Kerala Panineeyam, Keralapaniniyam) is a treatise on Malayalam grammar and rhetoric, written by A. R. Raja Raja Varma, grammarian, litterateur and one of the pioneers of Malayalam Language studies. The book was first published in 1896 and earned its author the sobriquet, Kerala Panini, after the Sanskrit grammarian, Panini. It is considered to be an epoch making work on the growth and structure of Malayalam language.

Keralapanineeyam consists of 8 sections and their subsections:
 Peedika - History of the Malayalam language, alphabets and language evolution.
 Sandhiprakaram – defines sentences and compound words
 Namadhikaram – discusses grammatical gender, countability, words formed by joining two or more words, adjectives, adverbs, formation of new words denoting a set of words
 Dhathwadhikaram – describes imperative sentences, active / passive sentences, prefix words (khiladathu), suffixes, affirmative/negative usages, complex and compound sentences
 Bhedhakadhikaram – further description of adjectives
 Nipathavyayadhikaram - describes words with multiple meanings/usages
 Akamshadhikaram – describes linking words
 Shabhdolpathi – essay on word formation and evolutions.

Keralapanineeyam was one of the first scientific descriptions of Malayalam grammar. A.R. Raja Raja Varma complemented the treatise with subsequent works such as Bhashabhooshanam and Vritha Manjari.

In 2017, on the 100th anniversary of its first publication, the digitised version of Keralapanineeyam was released by Sayahna Foundation under Creative Commons ShareAlike License.

References

External links 
 http://central.tnopac.gov.in/cgi-bin/koha/opac-detailprint.pl?biblionumber=149480
 http://www.thehindu.com/news/cities/Kochi/a-royal-who-spoke-commoners-tongue/article4439819.ece
 http://www.veethi.com/articles/thampuran-of-malayalam-language-article-2607.htm
 http://books.sayahna.org/ml/pdf/keralapanineeyam.pdf

Indian non-fiction books
Malayalam-language literature
books
Malayalam grammar